Krzydłowice  is a village in the administrative district of Gmina Grębocice, within Polkowice County, Lower Silesian Voivodeship, in south-western Poland. In the years 1870-1945 it was in Germany.

References

Villages in Polkowice County